The Bulgarian Basketball Cup MVP is an award that is given to the most outstanding player in the Bulgarian Basketball Cup tournament. The winner of the award is decided by a panel of the Bulgarian Basketball Federation. The winner of the award is not necessarily coming from the team that wins the cup title.

Winners

Awards won by nationality

Awards won by club

References

Basketball most valuable player awards
Cup MVP
European basketball awards